The Zambia National Service, abbreviated ZNS, is part of the Zambian Defence Force whose primary objective is to train Zambian citizens in agriculture and craft skillsit was formed in 1963 as a Land Army before it was renamed to Zambia National Service. ZNS is also a major sponsor of Green Eagles.

History 
Established in 1963 by the United National Independence Party as a youth wing of the independence movement, known as the Land Army which was set to be used as a military option in an event that independence negotiations on the round table failed. As of October 24, 1964, after the peaceful acquisition of independence, the Land Army had was demobilized. On December 20, 1971 through an Act of Parliament a more militant ZNS was born. With Zambia's position in the anti-apartheid struggle in South Africa, a military training component became part of the ZNS. In 1974 military training became compulsory for form five school leavers, university graduates and government officials. In 1980 the compulsory training for form five school leavers was stopped.

Commandants

Functions 

 Direction, coordination and conduct of all military operations
 Training of citizens and service personnel as determined by the Government of the Republic of Zambia and Administration branch
 Provision and maintenance of the communication systems within the service
 Liaison with other services and security wings on matters of defense and security
 Employment of its members in tasks of national importance e.g. Disaster management and mitigation
 Defense of the Republic and Agricultural production

References 

Land force
Military units and formations established in 1963